Gone to Ground is a 1977 Australian TV movie about a man pursued by a killer.

It was one of a series of TV movies Bruning made for Channel 7. Although he sold them to Paramount for worldwide distribution, he found making them was not profitable, so sold his company to Reg Grundy.

Plot
Jimmy Flemming, the owner of a surfing supply store has been receiving death threats. After he is beaten up by surfers he "goes to ground" with his wife Angela and the house of an old friend. However they are followed there by a mysterious motorcyclist.

Harry Ferguson is married to Grace but is sleeping with his secretary Kathleen.

Cast
Eric Oldfield as Jimmy Flemming
Charles 'Bud' Tingwell as Harry Ferguson
Elaine Lee as Grace Ferguson
Robyn Gibbes as Angela Flemming
Marion Johns as Ma Bishop
Dennis Grosvenor as Bart
Judy Lynne as Kathleen
Allan Penney as Peters
Marcus Haleas as Anderson
John Orcsik

Production
The film was shot in Sydney, including some night scenes at Luna Park.

Reception
The Sydney Morning Herald said that "Eric Oldfield conies off exceptionally well" and the script has "more twists than a corkscrew" but the direction "involves a conglomeration of quick scene changes, flashbacks and slow motion that does nothing more than confuse. So swiftly do the scenes change that dialogue often overlaps into the next frame. It takes about 40 minutes to get some idea of what the film is about."

Another review in the same paper said the script "reduces a taut thriller to a limp farce" where the dialogue was "ineffably silly."

References

External links
Gone to Ground at Peter Malone site

 http://www.bfi.org.uk/films-tv-people/4ce2b7201a7c5

Gone to Ground at Screen Australia
Gone to Ground at AustLit

Australian television films
1977 television films
1977 films
Australian thriller films
1970s thriller films
Films directed by Kevin James Dobson
1970s English-language films